Laura Foralosso (born 21 October 1965) is an Italian former backstroke swimmer who competed in the 1980 Summer Olympics.

References

1965 births
Living people
Italian female backstroke swimmers
Olympic swimmers of Italy
Swimmers at the 1980 Summer Olympics
Swimmers at the 1979 Mediterranean Games
20th-century Italian women